Røyrvik is the administrative centre in Røyrvik municipality in Trøndelag county, Norway. It sits at the northern end of the large lake Limingen. Røyrvik Church is located in the village.

Name
The village (and municipality) is named after the old Røyrvik farm (historically: Røirviken), since the first church, Røyrvik Church, was built there (in 1828). The first element is røyr which means Arctic char and the last element is vik which means "inlet".

References

Villages in Trøndelag
Røyrvik